Liu Yan is a classical Chinese dancer. She has performed in many dance dramas and won many dance competitions in and outside China.

Early life
As a child, Liu had a passion for classical Chinese dance. She started dancing when she was only 9 years old. When she was 10 years old, Liu gained admission to the Beijing Dance Academy middle school. When she was 11 years old, in 1993, she entered the Beijing Dance Academy middle school.

Liu later enrolled at the Beijing Dance Academy at the age of 18. During her education, she studied professional dancing with a major in classical Chinese dance, ultimately graduating in 2003.

Career
Liu has performed in the 2007 CCTV New Year's Gala, alongside some of the nation's most famous people. She has also won some of the nation's most prestigious awards for dance and drama.

Liu was chosen to be the lead dancer in the "Silk Road" segment at the Beijing 2008 Olympics opening ceremony.  Twelve days before the actual performance, on 27 July, she fell from a malfunctioning moving platform during an evening rehearsal at the Beijing National Stadium. She was rushed to a local military hospital to undergo six hours of surgery. Her accident resulted in nerve and spinal damage, paralyzing her lower body.

In March 2010, Liu established the Liu Yan Arts Special Fund, to help unfortunate children in poverty-stricken areas, orphans, and migrant workers' children through an art education. Since March 2010, she has been giving classes at the Beijing Dance Academy. As reported in 2012, she is pursuing a doctorate degree in Dance theory at the Beijing Dance Academy.

In 2016, Liu published her research about hand gestures of classical Chinese dance in a book called Dance with Hands: Research of the Hand Dance in Chinese Classical Dances.

References

1982 births
Chinese female dancers
Living people
Place of birth missing (living people)
Educators from Beijing
People with paraplegia
Beijing Dance Academy alumni